Rebecca Boggs Roberts (born 1970) is the Curator of Programming at Planet Word, and was formerly an American journalist. She was one of the hosts of POTUS '08 on XM Radio, which offered live daily coverage of the 2008 presidential election. She served as a substitute host for Morning Edition, Talk of the Nation, and Weekend Edition Sunday on National Public Radio.

Biography
Born to reporters Cokie (née Boggs) and Steve Roberts, Roberts earned a B.A. in political science from Princeton University.

Roberts began with Shorr & Associates, a political media firm in Philadelphia. She was technology reporter for The World, a radio program produced by the BBC and Public Radio International, for four years. She hosted Your Call, a local call-in program, on KALW in San Francisco and moved to Washington, D.C., to host The Intersection, a news talk show, on WETA from 2006 to 2007. For NPR, she has reported on such diverse topics as the US immigration debate, the Israeli–Palestinian conflict, transgenic goats, amateur astronomers, Bikram yoga, and Icelandic geysers.

She served as Program Director of the Congressional Cemetery.

Works 

Roberts' books include:

Notes

References

Living people
American women journalists
NPR personalities
Princeton University alumni
1970 births
Roberts family (journalism)
Boggs family
Claiborne family